Lagharai is a town in Mamund Tehsil, Bajaur Agency, Federally Administered Tribal Areas, Pakistan. The population is 592 according to the 2017 census.

References 

Populated places in Bajaur District